For All Those Sleeping was an American metalcore band formed in Sartell, Minnesota in 2007.  The band released three studio albums, Cross Your Fingers, Outspoken, and Incomplete Me, all of which featured the same line-up. They announced their breakup on October 9, 2014.

History

Formation and Cross Your Fingers (2007–2011) 
For All Those Sleeping was formed in 2007 while Mike Champa, Jerad Pierskalla, David Volgman-Stevens and Ethan Trekell were still students at Sartell High School. Their self-released their 2007 demo and 2008 EP "The Lies We Live" featured the band's original sound which combined melodic sounds with pop punk influences, and brutal breakdowns. The band would later add bassist/vocalist London Snetsinger, replacing guitarist/keyboardist David Volgman-Steven's duties as the band's main clean vocalist. As their local fanbase grew, the band gained the attention of Fearless Records, and were signed in May 2010.

During the following months, the band was announced as supporting acts for multiple bands. In May they were announced as supporting acts for a short June tour featuring Honor Bright with From First To Last The band was also announced 
as support for Drop Dead Gorgeous's headlining tour along with Sleeping With Sirens, Attila, Abandon All Ships, Woe, Is Me and Scarlett O'Hara.

On June 25, 2010 the band announced pre-order bundles for their forthcoming album, Cross Your Fingers set for a July 20, 2010 release. The band also released their debut single from the album, "Never Leave Northfield". The second single, "Outbreak of Heartache" was released on July 13 through PureVolume

Their debut, Cross Your Fingers, released on July 20, 2010, through Fearless Records, was met with mostly mixed reviews. The album was heavily influenced by the bands love of horror films, and of their hometown's history, evident in songs "Outbreak of Heartache" and "Never Leave Northfield", the latter of the two based on Jesse James and the James Gang's final bank robbery in Minnesota.

Following the release of the album, the band toured extensively to promote their debut. On September 9, 2010 the band was announced as part of A Skylit Drive's November headlining tour with Motionless in White, Woe, Is Me and Scarlett O'Hara.

The band contributed "Maybe This Christmas" to the Fearless Records' Christmas Compilation.

On December 16, 2010 the band were announced as part of The Smart Punk Tour with The Word Alive, Upon a Burning Body, Abandon All Ships and The Color Morale beginning in March and ending in April.

In May 2011, the band made an appearance at Bled Fest. During 2011, the band participated in multiple tours, two prominent ones being the "2011 All Star Tour" in the summer, and the "Fearless Friends Tour" in the fall. They toured with After the Burial, Attila, Memphis May Fire, Motionless in White, Chelsea Grin and Sleeping With Sirens during the All Star, Tour and with fellow Fearless acts blessthefall, Motionless in White and The Word Alive during the fall.

August 17, 2011 the band was announced to support Falling in Reverse on their US headlining tour with Eyes Set to Kill beginning in September and ending in October.

The band released a music video for their song, "I'm Not Dead Yet" from their debut album, "Cross Your Fingers" during early October. The band later contributed their cover of Taylor Swift's song "You Belong With Me" as part of Fearless Records' Punk Goes Pop Volume 4.

Outspoken (2012–2013) 
On January 17, 2012 the band announced that they would be entering the studio with Cameron Mizell to begin recording their second album. Vocalist Mike Champa released the following statement along with their studio announcement: "Fans can expect an honest album that’s influenced by the experiences we’ve gone through this past year on and off the road. These experiences really are what make the lyrics on this next album so much more relatable and open. Also, it’s a lot heavier than Cross Your Fingers. We’re excited for fans to hear it!"

In February 2012 the band announced that they had finished recording their second album.

On March 5, 2012 the band announced their spring US tour "The Soundrink Tour with direct support from In Fear and Faith, Dream On, Dreamer, Casino Madrid and Adestria.

On April 25, 2012 the band released their new song, "Mark My Words" which is the first single from their second album, "Outspoken". The lyric video was released on May 7, 2012. Later that month a lyric video for their new single, "Once a Liar (Always a Fake)" was released and the release date for their forthcoming album was announced.

Outspoken was released on June 19, 2012. The album showcased a much heavier metalcore sound with more prominent usage of screaming vocals and limited use of pop punk style choruses which were featured regularly on their debut. This released was met with mostly average to positive reviews, most noting their improvement in their overall sound, and lyrical content, while also noting the stark similarities to other bands of their genre such as A Day to Remember. Prior to and following their second release the band toured with In Fear and Faith, and Attack Attack!

On August 19, 2012 the band was announced as part of the 2012 Scream It Like You Mean It Tour along with Woe, Is Me, Impending Doom, Abandon All Ships, Secrets, and Volumes.

On December 14, 2012 the band was announced as support for I See Stars' The Filthy February Tour with fellow supporting acts Get Scared, At the Skylines and Upon This Dawning.

On February 4, 2013 the band released their music video for, "Mark My Words". Towards the end of February the band was announced as support for Chunk! No, Captain Chunk!'s long-awaited US headlining tour with fellow support from City Lights and Upon This Dawning.

On April 4, 2013 the band was announced as part of the 2013 All Stars Tour alongside fellow acts; Every Time I Die, Chelsea Grin, Veil of Maya, Terror, Stray from the Path, Capture the Crown, Iwrestledabearonce, Dayshell and Volumes. 
On August 21, 2013 the band was announced as part of the Rise Up Tour supporting A Skylit Drive's new release with fellow supporting acts Wolves at the Gate, I the Mighty, and PVRIS. The band performed as part of Warped Tour Australia in November and December.

Incomplete Me and Break-up (2014) 
On January 1, 2014, the band was announced to be working on new music based on Fearless Records YouTube video announcing music being released by the label in the coming year by label artist.

On March 6, 2014, the band announced they would be playing all of Warped Tour 2014, along with PVRIS, The Summer Set, Get Scared, Dangerkids, DayShell, Heart to Heart, Pacific Dub, DJ Nicola Bear, Watsky, Wax and One oK Rock.

On May 7, 2014 the band announced that they would be releasing a new album, Incomplete Me through Fearless Records on June 23 during their time on this years Warped Tour. Along with the announcement the band released a song teaser for "Crosses" the first single from the album. On May 14 the official lyric video for "Crosses" was released.

The band premiered the music video for title track "Incomplete Me" on June 3 through Revolver magazine. They also released the single version on iTunes the same day. The video is now being streamed on the Fearless Records YouTube channel. The full album was streamed the day after the initial release. Incomplete Me was released to mostly mixed to positive reviews, but charted at #2 on both the iTunes Rock and the iTunes Metal Charts.

The group announced on their Facebook page on October 9, 2014, that they had disbanded, and would be playing two more final shows, with support from Out Came The Wolves.

On February 7, 2017, former lead singer Mike Champa announced he would be releasing a solo single on February 21 produced by Jerad Pierskalla.

Members 
 Mike Champa – lead vocals (2007–2014)
 David Volgman-Stevens – lead guitar, keyboards (2007–2014), clean vocals (2007–2008)
 Jerad Pierskalla – rhythm guitar, backing unclean vocals (2007–2014)
 Ethan Trekell – drums (2007–2014)
 London Snetsinger – bass, clean vocals (2008–2014)

Timeline

Discography

Studio albums

Extended plays 
The Lies We Live (Self-Released, 2008)

Music videos

References

External links 
 

Metalcore musical groups from Minnesota
Musical groups established in 2007
Fearless Records artists